Richard Dawson of Dawson Grove, County Monaghan (c. 1693 – 29 December 1766) was an Irish Member of Parliament.

Biography
Dawson was a banker at Dublin and an alderman of Dublin Corporation. He sat in the Irish House of Commons for St Canice from 1727 to 1760 and for Monaghan from 1761 until his death. By his wife Elizabeth, daughter of John Vesey, Archbishop of Tuam, he was the father of Thomas Dawson, 1st Viscount Cremorne.

References

1690s births
1766 deaths
Irish MPs 1727–1760
Irish MPs 1761–1768
Politicians from County Monaghan
Members of the Parliament of Ireland (pre-1801) for County Kilkenny constituencies
Members of the Parliament of Ireland (pre-1801) for County Monaghan constituencies
Richard